Moustapha Quaynor (born 17 July 1995) is a Ghanaian footballer who most recently played for FK Vardar as a midfielder.

After initially joining FC Strathmore in Australia, Quaynor joined St Albans Saints SC for a brief stint in June 2016 before eventually joining Pascoe Vale FC.

References

External links

1995 births
Living people
Ghanaian footballers
AEL Limassol players
Alki Larnaca FC players
Ermis Aradippou FC players
Cypriot First Division players
National Premier Leagues players
Expatriate soccer players in Australia
Ghanaian expatriate footballers
Expatriate footballers in Cyprus
Ghanaian expatriate sportspeople in Cyprus
Association football midfielders
Aduana Stars F.C. players